Robert Simpson (15 September 1915 – 13 January 1994) was an English footballer who made 109 appearances in the Football League playing for Darlington and Hartlepools United either side of the Second World War. An outside forward, he also played non-league football for West Auckland Town and Stockton.

References

1915 births
1994 deaths
Sportspeople from Bishop Auckland
Footballers from County Durham
English footballers
Association football wingers
West Auckland Town F.C. players
Darlington F.C. players
Hartlepool United F.C. players
Stockton F.C. players
English Football League players